CCGS Cape Discovery  is one of the Canadian Coast Guard's 36 s.`
She is stationed at Goderich, Ontario. At the vessel's official christening, on June 10, 2006, the Minister of Fisheries and Oceans Canada, Loyola Hearn, said:
"Having this state-of-the-art vessel for our personnel provides them with greater safety, as they aid those in distress -- very often in conditions that put their own lives at risk. With the cutter Cape Discovery, we are well positioned to respond to emergency calls, twenty-four hours a day, seven days a week."

Design
It contains two computer-operated Detroit DDEC-III 6V-92TA diesel engines providing a combined . It has two  four-blade propellers, and its complement is four crew members and five passengers.

Communication options include Raytheon 152 HF-SSB and Motorola Spectra 9000 VHF50W radios, and a Raytheon RAY 430 loudhailer system. The boat also supports the Simrad TD-L1550 VHF-FM radio direction finder. Raytheon provides a number of other electronic systems for the lifeboat, including the RAYCHART 620, the ST 30 heading indicator and ST 50 depth indicator, the NAV 398 global positioning system, a RAYPILOT 650 autopilot system, and either the R41X AN or SPS-69 radar systems.

References

External links

 Canadian Coast Guard homepage

Cape-class motor lifeboats
2004 ships
Ships built in British Columbia
Ships of the Canadian Coast Guard